Titanio magnificalis is a species of moth in the family Crambidae. It is found in Russia and Turkmenistan.

References

Moths described in 1877
Odontiini
Taxa named by Hugo Theodor Christoph